Abhishek Tiwari (born 4 October 1989) is an Indian cricketer. He made his List A debut for Services in the 2018–19 Vijay Hazare Trophy on 19 September 2018.

References

External links
 

1989 births
Living people
Indian cricketers
Services cricketers
Place of birth missing (living people)